Otozamites is an extinct form genus of leaves belonging to the Bennettitales.

Otozamites are an extinct form genus of leaves related to the Bennettitales.[4]

Most of the Otozamites leaves are secluded and conserved as pinnae.[5]

Leaflet of Otozamites have the shape of an elongated triangular shape with an acute apex.[6]

Otozamites pinnae that emerge from the rachis has never been recorded ever before in the history of the organism, worldwide.[7]

References 
4. Wang, Y. D., Ni, Q., Jiang, Z. K., & Tian, N. (2008). Diversity variation and tempo-spatial distribution of Otozamites (Bennettitales) in                   the Mesozoic of China. Palaeoworld, 17(3-4), 222–234.

5. Barale, G. (1987). New observations on Otozamites pterophylloides Schimper 1872, emend. Saporta 1874, from the Jurassic of France and Denmark. Review of palaeobotany and palynology, 51(1-3), 117–126.

6.  Küpper, K. (1968). Die Gattung Otozamites. Taxon, 17(5), 548–552.

7.  OHANA, T., & KIMURA, T. (1991, December). 929. PERMINERALIZED OTOZAMITES LEAVES (BENNETTITALES) FROM THE UPPER CRETACEOUS OF HOKKAIDO, JAPAN. In Transactions and proceedings of the Paleontological Society of Japan. New series (Vol. 1991, No. 164, pp. 944–963). Palaeontological Society of Japan.

Prehistoric plant genera
Bennettitales
Triassic plants
Jurassic plants
Cretaceous plants
Prehistoric plants of North America